Rashmika Mandanna (born 5 April 1996) is an Indian actress who works predominantly in Telugu and Kannada films in addition to Hindi and Tamil films. She is a recipient of four SIIMA Awards and a Filmfare Award South. Her most commercially successful films include Kirik Party (2016), Anjani Putra (2017), Yajamana (2019), Sarileru Neekevvaru (2020), Bheeshma (2020), Pogaru (2021), Pushpa: The Rise (2021), Sita Ramam (2022) and Varisu (2023). She won the Filmfare Critics Award for Best Actress – South for her performance in the Telugu romantic comedy Geetha Govindam (2018).

Early life and education 
Rashmika Mandanna was born on 5 April 1996 in a Kodava family to Suman and Madan Mandanna in Virajpet, a town in Kodagu district of Karnataka. She completed her early schooling from Coorg Public School in Kodagu. She studied for a bachelor's degree in Psychology, Journalism and English Literature at the M. S. Ramaiah College of Arts, Science and Commerce in Bangalore.

Career 
In 2016, Rashmika made her acting debut in Kirik Party, which went on to become one of the highest-grossing films of the year in Kannada. Rashmika's performance received praise from multiple reviewers. She won SIIMA Award for the Best Debut Actress for the role. In 2017, Rashmika appeared in two Kannada films Anjani Putra and Chamak. She was nominated for Filmfare Award for Best Actress – Kannada at 65th Filmfare Awards South for her role in the film Chamak.

In 2018, she starred in Geetha Govindam opposite Vijay Deverakonda, which was also wildly successful. In 2020, Rashmika starred opposite Mahesh Babu in Telugu film Sarileru Neekevvaru, which became one of the highest-grossing Telugu films. In the same year she appeared in the film Bheeshma. In 2021, her first release was with the film Pogaru. Later in Sulthan alongside Karthi and in Pushpa: The Rise starring Allu Arjun. In 2022, Rashmika starred in Aadavallu Meeku Johaarlu. She then appeared in Sita Ramam and Goodbye.
In 2023, she starred in her second Tamil film Varisu opposite Vijay which was one of the highest grossing Tamil film.

Rashmika was at 24th position of 'Bangalore Times 25 Most Desirable Women of 2016' and the winner of the 'Bangalore Times 30 Most Desirable women of 2017'. In October 2021, she peaked Forbes India's most influential actors on social media.

Rashmika has signed a Hindi film Animal opposite Ranbir Kapoor.

Personal life 
Rashmika began dating her co-star Rakshit Shetty during making of Kirik Party, and the couple got engaged on 3 July 2017 in a private party at her hometown of Virajpet. The couple mutually broke off their engagement in September 2018, citing compatibility issues.

Filmography

Music video

Awards and nominations

See also 
 List of Indian film actresses

References

External links 

 
 

Living people
Actresses in Kannada cinema
Indian film actresses
Kodava people
People from Kodagu district
Indian Hindus
21st-century Indian actresses
South Indian International Movie Awards winners
Zee Cine Awards Telugu winners
1996 births
Actresses in Telugu cinema
Actresses from Karnataka
Actresses in Hindi cinema
Actresses in Tamil cinema